Frederick Lehrle Barry (March 23, 1897 – October 5, 1960) was the fourth Bishop of the Episcopal Diocese of Albany in the United States from 1950 to 1960, during which he re-built a diocese.

Early life
Barry was ordained a priest in 1925.  He was a curate at St. Paul's, Flatbush.  He served as rector at St. Gabriel's, Hollis, St. John's, Bridgeport, Connecticut, and St. Luke's, Evanston, Illinois.  He was a bachelor his entire life.

Work as Bishop
"On May 2, 1945, ... Barry was elected Bishop Coadjutor of Albany."  He was consecrated, in a "magnificent demonstration," at the Cathedral of All Saints by Presiding Bishop Most Reverend Henry St. George Tucker, incumbent Albany Bishop George Ashton Oldham, and "Bishop Stires, retired Bishop of Long Island, who had ordained Frederick Barry to the priesthood."  Upon Bishop Oldham's retirement, Bishop Barry was "enthroned" in the cathedra in the Cathedral of All Saints on January 25, 1950.

Bishop Barry travelled widely though the 19-county diocese to confirm parishioners, to ordain priests, and to preach. He specifically "was assigned jurisdiction over the missionary work of the Diocese."  He founded "the Adirondack Mission... [f]or more than forty years, a team of clergy" to service the spiritual needs of several small parishes in the Adirondack Mountains area.  He was an active leader in the Episcopal church.

In May 1950, at the end of a stormy Diocesan convention held at the Lake Placid Club, he nominated David E. Richards, then a priest at St. George's Church, Schenectady, who was elected his first suffragan bishop.  Richards served until 1957, when he was elected to be the Missionary Bishop of Central America.

He asked for a replacement, and the Very Rev. Allen W. Brown, then Dean of the Cathedral of All Saints, was elected Suffragan Bishop of Albany in October 1958, over Charles Bowen Persell, Jr., his only close competitor. Brown was consecrated on February 22, 1959, at St. John's Church, Ogdensburg, by Presiding Bishop the Most Reverend Arthur C. Lichtenberger.  In 1960, Bishop Barry died in a hospital after some time in ill health, and the see was left vacant.  Brown was elected and consecrated bishop in 1961 to replace Barry.  Barry is buried in the Lady Chapel of the Cathedral of All Saints.

See also

 List of Episcopal bishops (U.S.)

References

External links
 Cathedral of All Saints web site
 Episcopal Diocese of Albany official web site
 Newsprint photograph of Bishop Barry
 Monograph on Bishop Barry from Project Canterbury

Anglo-Catholic bishops
Religious leaders from Albany, New York
1897 births
1960 deaths
American Anglo-Catholics
20th-century Anglican bishops in the United States
Episcopal bishops of Albany